Arnold Olav Eidslott (10 June 1926 – 19 April 2018) was a Norwegian poet.

He was born in Ålesund, and worked as a telegraphic engineer for the whole of his working life. From 1986 to 2018 he was the poet laureate.

Eidslott's Christian religion was central to his lyrics, and he was foremost in Norwegian religious literature. He was a member of the Norwegian Academy for Language and Literature. He died on 19 April 2018 at the age of 91.

Johan Kvandal's composition "Underet in three parts, is based on Eidslott's poem of the same name. The parts that have been written are: "Krusifikset blør", "Josef av Arimateas klage" and "Den tomme grav".

Bibliography
Vinden taler til den døve – poem (1953)
Vann og støv – poem (1956)
Kronen av røk – poem (1959)
Av dynd og Amazonas – poem (1963)
Manes – poem (1965)
Memento – poem (1967)
Elegisk om sirkus – poem (1970)
Ved midnatt da havet sank – poem (1971)
Rekviem for Lasarus – poem (1973)
Veien til Astapovo – poem (1976)
Det forlatte øyeblikk – poem (1978)
Den tause ambassadør – poem (1980)
Flukten til katakombene – poem (1982)
Adam imago Dei – poem (1984)
Dikt i utvalg – (1986)
Advarsel i kode – poem (1987)
De navnløses kor – poem (1989)
Under San Marcos murer – poem (1991)
Lyset over den dømte – poem (1993)
Pax Christi – poem (1995)
Passchendaeles ruiner – poem (1998)
Nettene under Kapp Horn – poem (2000)
Davids nøkkel – poem (2001)
Arameisk i Roma – poem (2002)
Koret over Forum Romanum – poem (2004)
Lyset fra Bach – poem (2006)
Vinden blåser dit den vil – poems (2008)
Postludium – poems (2012)

Prizes
Gyldendal's Endowment 1963
Det Norske Akademis Pris 1983
Aschehougprisen 1983
Dobloug Prize 1992

Works about the poet
Asbjørn Aarnes and Helge Nordahl (ed.) (2000): "Hellig hav: om Arnold Eidslotts diktning". Oslo: Verbum.

References

NRK: Poet files with Arnold Eidslott
 Arnold Eidslott at NRK Authors
 Arnold Eidslott at Dagbladet Authors
 Arnold Eidslott at Aftenposten Alex

1926 births
2018 deaths
20th-century Norwegian poets
Norwegian male poets
People from Ålesund
Members of the Norwegian Academy
Dobloug Prize winners
21st-century Norwegian poets
20th-century Norwegian male writers
21st-century Norwegian male writers